Indian country is any of the many self-governing Native American/American Indian communities throughout the United States.  As a legal category, it includes "all land within the limits of any Indian reservation", "all dependent Indian communities within the borders of the United States", and "all Indian allotments, the Indian titles to which have not been extinguished."

Legal classification

This legal classification defines American Indian tribal and individual land holdings as part of a reservation, an allotment, or a public domain allotment. All federal trust lands held for Native American tribes is Indian country. Federal, state, and local governments use this category in their legal processes. Today, however, according to the U.S. Census of 2010, over 78% of all Native Americans live off reservations. Indian country now spans thousands of rural areas, towns and cities where Indian people live. 

This convention is followed generally in colloquial speech and is reflected in publications such as the Native American newspaper Indian Country Today

Related and historical meanings 
Historically, Indian country was considered the areas, regions, territories or countries beyond the frontier of settlement that were inhabited primarily by Native Americans. Colonists made treaties with Native Americans agreeing to offer services and protection indefinitely in exchange for peaceful transfer of Native American land.

Between the Appalachians and Mississippi

As the original 13 colonies grew and treaties were made, the de facto boundary between settled territory and Indian country during the 18th century was roughly the crest of the Appalachian Mountains, a boundary set into law by the Royal Proclamation of 1763, the Confederation Congress Proclamation of 1783, and later by the Nonintercourse Act. The Indian Reserve was gradually settled by European Americans and divided into territories and states, starting with Kentucky County (an extension of Virginia) and the Northwest Territory.

West of the Mississippi

Most Indians in the area of the former Reserve were either killed or relocated further west under policies of Indian Removal. After the Louisiana Purchase, the Indian Intercourse Act of 1834 created the Indian Territory west of the Mississippi River as a destination. It too was gradually divided into territories and states for European American settlement, leaving only modern Indian Reservations inside the boundaries of U.S. states.

In 2020, the United States Supreme Court ruled in McGirt v. Oklahoma that the tribal statistical area (and former reservation) of the Muscogee (Creek) Nation remains under the tribal sovereignty of the Muscogee (Creek) Nation for the purposes of the Major Crimes Act.

Current non-legal usage
In the current usage the term "Indian country" is used by "soldiers, military strategists, reporters, and World Wide Web users to refer to hostile, unsecured, and dangerous territory in Iraq and Afghanistan."

See also
Aboriginal title in the United States
Indian country jurisdiction
Native American reservation politics
Off-reservation trust land
Oklahoma Tribal Statistical Area
Tribal sovereignty in the United States
Land Buy-Back Program for Tribal Nations

References 

 N. Bruce Duthu, American Indians and the  Law (NY: Penguin Library -Viking - 2008)
 David H. Getches, Charles F. Wilkinson, and Robert A. Williams, jr., Cases and Materials on Federal Indian Law, 4th Ed. (St. Paul: West Pub., 1998)
 Imre Sutton, ed., "The Political Geography of Indian Country." American Indian Culture and Research Journal, 15(02) 1991

https://www.census.gov/prod/cen2010/briefs/c2010br-10.pdf

Native American culture
Cultural regions of the United States